Licrostroma is a genus of fungi in the family Corticiaceae. The genus is monotypic, containing the single species Licrostroma subgiganteum found in North America and Japan. It is an anamorphic form of Michenera.

References

External links
 

Corticiales
Monotypic Basidiomycota genera
Fungi of Asia
Fungi of North America